Going Up may refer to:
Going up and going down, terms in commutative algebra which refer to certain properties of chains of prime ideals in integral extensions
Going Up (musical), a musical comedy that opened in New York in 1917 and in London in 1918
Going Up (film), a 1923 film starring Douglas MacLean
"Going Up" (TV episode), an episode of PBS's POV series
Going Up (2007 film), starring Nandita Chandra
"Going Up", a song by Echo & the Bunnymen from their 1980 album Crocodiles
"Going Up", a common announcement played in elevators